Kozlinovsky is a rural locality (a khutor) in Staroanninskoye Rural Settlement, Novoanninsky District, Volgograd Oblast, Russia. The population was 248 as of 2010. There are 3 streets.

Geography 
Kozlinovsky is located on the Bolshiye Yaryzhki Lake, 16 km southwest of Novoanninsky (the district's administrative centre) by road. Staroanninskaya is the nearest rural locality.

References 

Rural localities in Novoanninsky District